Villejuif is a commune in the southern suburbs of Paris, France.

Name

The earliest reference to Villejuif appears in a bill signed by the Pope Callixtus II on 27 November 1119. It refers to Villa Judea, the Latinized version of the Old French expression meaning 'Jewish settlement'. During the following centuries, the toponym appears as Villejuifve, that is, following the archaic French spelling of the expression with the same meaning, cognate to modern French Villejuive. The French author from the 17th century Louis Moréri indicates that the settlement was founded by Jews expelled from Paris. This idea, however, remains speculative as available medieval Christian and Jewish sources do not mention the existence of the Jewish community in this place.

Geography

Climate

Villejuif has a oceanic climate (Köppen climate classification Cfb).

Demographics

Population

Immigration

Transport
Villejuif is served by three stations on Paris Métro Line 7: Villejuif – Léo Lagrange, Villejuif – Paul Vaillant-Couturier, and Villejuif – Louis Aragon.

Notable people
Camille Loiseau, the oldest person in France from 26 March 2005 to 12 August 2006, died in VIllejuif at the age of 114
Komitas, Armenian priest, musicologist and composer, died here

Hospitals
Villejuif has several hospitals on its territory :
 the Institut Gustave Roussy, an oncology hospital;
 the Hôpital Paul-Brousse;
 the Paul Guiraud hospital.

Education 
13 preschools, 11 elementary schools, and five junior high schools (Collège Aimé-Césaire, Collège Guy-Môquet, Collège Jean Lurçat, Collège Karl Marx, Collège Pasteur) are in Villejuif. Lycée intercommunal Darius-Milhaud (in Le Kremlin-Bicêtre) serves Villejuif.

Other institutions:
 EFREI
 École Pour l'Informatique et les Techniques Avancées
 Institut Sup'Biotech de Paris

Twin towns – sister cities

Villejuif is twinned with:
 Dunaújváros, Hungary
 Mirandola, Italy
 Neubrandenburg, Germany
 Vila Franca de Xira, Portugal
 Yambol, Bulgaria

See also
The leaflet of Villejuif
Communes of the Val-de-Marne department
Hôtel de la Capitainerie des Chasses

References

External links

 Official website

 
Communes of Val-de-Marne